Hellinsia nigricalcarius is a moth of the family Pterophoridae. It is found in Colombia.

References

Moths described in 1996
nigricalcarius
Moths of South America